The Nicholas Roerich Museum in New York City is dedicated to the works of Nicholas Roerich, a Russian-born artist whose work focused on nature scenes from the Himalayas. The museum is located in a brownstone at 319 West 107th Street on Manhattan's Upper West Side. The museum was originally located in the Master Apartments at 103rd Street and Riverside Drive, which were built especially for Roerich in 1929.

Although hampered by Indian export laws, the museum includes approximately 200 of Roerich's works as well as a collection of archival materials.

See also
 Agni Yoga
 Banner of Peace
 Russian cosmism
 Rerikhism
 List of single-artist museums

References

External links

 

Museums in Manhattan
Art museums and galleries in New York City
Roerich
Upper West Side
Roerich
Russian-American culture in New York City